Aglaia teysmanniana is a species of plant in the family Meliaceae. It is found in China, Indonesia, Malaysia, the Philippines, Thailand, and possibly Papua New Guinea.

References

teysmanniana
Near threatened plants
Taxonomy articles created by Polbot